Lindemans Brewery (Brouwerij Lindemans) is a Belgian family brewery based in Vlezenbeek, a small town in Flemish Brabant, southwestern Brussels.  It produces lambics, a style of Belgian ale that uses raw wheat and wild yeast.

History
The history of Lindemans Brewery began in 1822 when the brewery was founded on a small farm in Vlezenbeek. The brewery's patriarch was Frans Lindemans, the brother of the then-bailiff of Gaasbeek. In 1930, due to the growing success of the brewery, the agricultural activity was stopped definitively to focus on the brewing of Kriek and Gueuze. They produced their first Faro in 1978. Shortly after, in 1980 the brewery started its production of Framboise. Consequently, in 1986 and 1987, Lindemans added Cassis and Pêcheresse to its assortment. Finally, in 2005, Apple was the last beer to be introduced.

The brewery, to this day, is still a family company, run by brothers Nestor and Rene for a long time, before their sons, Dirk and Geert, took over the business, each having a 50% interest in the company.

Production

Lindemans brews its lambic according to the method of spontaneous fermentation. This lambic is then used as the base for all of the fruit beers. In 25 years, the production grew from 5.000 to 50.000 hectoliters. Over that span, the brewery expanded multiple times. In 1991 a new brewhouse was built next to the old one to increase capacity. In 2013 works for a new expansion, with a new bottling plant, started. Today, the brewery brews 85.000 hectoliters per year. 60.000 hectoliters of this amount is lambic, the base to which fruit juices are added. Each year 6.000 hectoliters of Lindemans Faro are produced, representing 7,5% of the entire production.

Beers

Faro

Lindemans Faro is a lambic beer. The first Lindemans Faro was brewed in 1978, when the beverage was becoming popular again. At 4% ABV, it is considered a light beer.  It is available in 250 ml, 375 ml and 750 ml bottles.

Fruit beers
Lindemans varieties include Lambic Framboise (raspberry), Kriek (sour cherry), Pêcheresse (peach), Cassis (blackcurrant), Pomme (apple), and Strawberry.

Because of the limited availability of sour cherries from Schaerbeek, the traditional ingredient for Kriek, Lindemans Kriek is made using unsweetened cherry juice which is added to a mixture of lambics of different ages. The resulting beer is described as less sour and more fruity. It contains 2.5% ABV.

Awards
 Asia Beer Awards
 2010, Silver in the category Fruit Lambique: Pecheresse
 Australian International Beer Awards
 2014, Gold Award: Cassis
 2014, Silver Award: Kriek
 2014, Silver Award: Oude Gueuze Cuvée René
 2014, Bronze Award: Pecheresse
 2014, Bronze Award: Apple
 Beer International Recognition Awards
 2011, Best Fruitbeer: Kriek
 2011, Belgian Grand Award: Kriek
 Brussels Beer Challenge
 2013, Gold Medal in the category Lambique and Gueuze: Oude Gueuze Cuvée René
 2013, Gold Medal in the category Fruit Lambique
 Great International Beer Festival
 2011, Gold Award: Faro
 International Beer Awards
 2010, Winner in the category Fruitbeers: Framboise
 US Open Beer Competition
 2011, Golden Award in the category Fruit and Spice: Pecheresse
 2014, Golden Award in the category Fruit and Spice: Pecheresse
 World Beer Awards
 2013, World's Best Sour Beer
 2013, World's Best Kriek
 2013, World's Best Gueuze: Oude Gueuze Cuvée René
 2013, Europe's Best Lambique: Apple
 2013, Europe's Best Label: Oude Gueuze Cuvée René
 World Beer Championships
 1994, Platinum Medal: Kriek
 1994, Gold Medal: Pecheresse
 World Brewing Congress
 1994, Platinum Award: Kriek
 1994, Gold Award: Pecheresse
 2001, World Champion: Kriek
 1985: Michael Jackson named Kriek Lindemans as one of the 5 best beers in the world.
 Californian Beer Festival
 1995, Gold Medal: Framboise
 1995, Gold Medal: Gueuze
 World Beer Cup
 1996 & 1997, Lindemans named one of the 10 best breweries in the world.
 2000, Gold Medal: Oude Gueuze Cuvée René
 2001, Beer-World Champion: Kriek
 2002, Bronze Medal: Oude Gueuze Cuvée
 Hong Kong International Beer Awards 
 2009, Winner Fruitbeers: Framboise
 2010, Winner Fruitbeers: Framboise

References

External links
 
RateBeer
BeerAdvocate
Brouwerij Lindemans  Brewery details from BeerTourism.com

Breweries of Flanders
Companies based in Flemish Brabant